The 1811 Independence Movement, known in El Salvador as the First Shout of Independence, was the first of a series of revolts in Central America in modern day El Salvador against Spanish rule and dependency on the Captaincy General of Guatemala. The independence movement was led by prominent Salvadoran and Central American figures such as José Matías Delgado, Manuel José Arce, and Santiago José Celis.

Prelude 

At the beginning of the 19th century, agitation grew in the American territories ruled by Spain. The previous century was dominated by the growing support of ideas of individual freedom, which characterized the Enlightenment that took place in Europe and the Americas. Most influential were the American Revolution, with the resulting liberation of the British Thirteen Colonies, and the French Revolution, which seeded the restlessness and search for freedom in the Spanish American territories under dominion of the Spanish. The appointment of Antonio Gutiérrez y Ulloa as Colonial Intendant of San Salvador on 28 June 1805 caused more unrest in San Salvador as he was seen as "infatuated" and "difficult" and was not popular with those living in the intendancy.

In the Intendancy of San Salvador, many Creoles and other settlers wanted to separate control of the colony from the Captaincy General of Guatemala, largely due to economic and political reasons. Greater administrative autonomy or outright independence for San Salvador would reduce the high level of taxes paid to Spain and Guatemala and would raise finances for the colony. Napoleón Bonaparte's invasion of Spain in 1808 and the removal of Ferdinand VII from the Spanish throne created an atmosphere of unrest in San Salvador and across all the Spanish American colonies.

Revolt in San Salvador 

The insurrectionists organized themselves along with prominent middle-class supporters of the cause of independence such as doctors and priests who took part in the event. These included doctors such as Santiago José Celis, the Aguilar y Bustamante brothers (Nicolás, Vicente and Manuel) and the priest José Matías Delgado. Others included Manuel José Arce, Juan Manuel Rodríguez and Pedro Pablo Castillo.

On November 5 the revolt began in San Salvador. According to tradition, the rebels waited for a signal from the bell tower of the Church of La Merced, but this did not occur on the scheduled time. The rebels later assembled on the town square outside the church where Manuel José Arce proclaimed in front of the public: "There is no King, nor Intendant, nor Captain General. We only must obey our alcaldes," meaning that since Ferdinand VII had been deposed, all other officials appointed by him no longer legitimately held power. A tumult in the square grew to the point that the intendant, Gutiérrez y Ulloa, asked that the gathered name somebody to formally receive their demands. Manuel José Arce himself was chosen and selected as the leader by the crowd. Despite this, the insurrectionists took arms and proclaimed the total independence of San Salvador from the Spanish crown, but were later subdued.

In the following days, the independence movement extended to the cities of Santiago Nonualco, Usulután, Chalatenango, Santa Ana, Tejutla and Cojutepeque. The two other notable revolts occurred on November 24 in the city of Metapán and on December 20 in Sensuntepeque.

Suppression and aftermath
Despite the efforts of the insurrectionists, the cause of independence was not shared by the city councils of the Intendancy. Neither San Miguel, nor San Vicente nor Santa Ana joined them. Unable to amass support, the rebels decided to negotiate with a delegation sent in from the Guatemalan capital to take control. The new Intendant Colonel José Alejandro de Aycinena, arrived on December 8 with Guatemalan troops and priests to force them to swear obedience to the crown and reclaimed the city. The new government was well received by the majority of the population due to Aycinena's policy of understanding and nonconfrontation. However, several days later, unrest broke out in the neighboring Intendancy of Nicaragua, where uprisings broke out in León on December 13 and later in Granada on December 22. Nevertheless, both were soon suppressed.

Many of those involved in the events in El Salvador and Nicaragua were incarcerated, but José Matías Delgado was taken back with the delegation to Guatemala City. Despite his past activities, or perhaps because of them, Delgado was elected in 1813 as a representative on the Provincial Deputation of Guatemala created by the Spanish Constitution of 1812. He also became director of the Tridentino Seminary in the capital city, therefore, he was not in El Salvador at the time of the second insurrection in 1814, and so did not take part in it.

He was once again elected provincial deputy in 1820 when the Spanish Constitution was restored, and on September 15, 1821, he was among those who signed the Act of Independence of Central America in Guatemala City. On November 28, 1821, he became political chief (jefe pólitico civil) of the Province of San Salvador, and as its executive officer, he led its separation from Guatemala to prevent the former intendancy from becoming part of First Mexican Empire. Arce later became president of the Federal Republic of Central America from 1825 to 1829, once full independence from both Spain and Mexico became a reality.

In El Salvador the independence movement and 1811 Revolt is officially commemorated every year on November 5 and recognized as the "First Shout for the Independence of Central America".

See also 

 1814 Independence Movement

References

Citations

Bibliography 

Dym, Jordana. 2006. From Sovereign Villages to National States: City, State, and Federation in Central America, 1759–1839. Albuquerque: University of New Mexico Press. 

Ministerio de Educación. (1994). Historia de El Salvador Tomo I. Mexico City, Comisión Nacional de los Libros de Texto Gratuitos.
Monterrrey, Francisco J. (1977). Historia de El Salvador anotaciones cronológicas 1810–1842. San Salvador: Editorial Universitaria.
 Vidal, Manuel. (1961). Nociones de historia de Centro América. San Salvador: Editorial Universitaria.

Independence
19th-century revolutions
Colonial Central America
Colonial Guatemala
Conflicts in 1811
El Salvador–Spain relations
History of El Salvador
Rebellions against the Spanish Empire
Spanish American wars of independence
Spanish colonization of the Americas